Park Crescent is at the north end of Portland Place and south of Marylebone Road in London. The crescent consists of elegant stuccoed terraced houses by the architect John Nash, which form a semicircle. The crescent is part of Nash's and wider town-planning visions of Roman-inspired imperial West End approaches to Regent's Park. It was originally conceived as a circus (circle) to be named Regent's Circus but instead Park Square was built to the north. The only buildings on the Regent's Park side of the square are small garden buildings, enabling higher floors of the Park Crescent buildings to have a longer, green northern view.

It was built under the patronage of the Prince Regent. As the freeholder, the Crown Estate co-organises repairs, maintains the gardens and has a minor, overarching interest, entitled to lease renewal premiums and any agreed ground rents.

Both terraces and the communal garden have statutory protection in the highest, rarest categories. This is Grade I listed status: on the National Heritage List for England and on the Register of Historic Parks and Gardens (as part of Regent's Park).

History
At an early stage, Nash proposed the construction of a "circus" (meaning a circular development), entailing another crescent to the north, but Park Square was constructed instead.
Work on Park Crescent started in 1806, but in the difficult economic conditions of the Napoleonic Wars, the builder Charles Mayor went bankrupt after six houses had been built. It was completed only in 1819 to 1821. Famous residents in the nineteenth century included Lord Lister, who, prior to his elevation to the peerage was created a baronet, of Park Crescent in the Parish of St Marylebone in the County of Middlesex.

The interiors of the buildings have been completely rebuilt. After the Second World War, Park Crescent was in poor condition (as were other Nash terraces near Regent's Park). The Gorell Report on the future of the Regent's Park terraces recommended that the facades of Park Crescent should be saved. In an example of facadism, they were restored in the 1960s, when the leases came up for renewal, and they are protected as grade I listed buildings. However, behind the curve of the crescent, the Crown Estate built new structures, sometimes for office rather than residential use. Interior features which are visible from the street, such as light fittings, have to respect the Regency design of the facade.

In recent years the Crescent has housed institutions such as International Students House, London and the Institute of Chartered Secretaries and Administrators. Many houses are now converted into expensive flats.

Garden
The semicircle is divided into two halves by Portland Place. Between the arms of the crescent is a private garden, which is recognised as being of historic interest. (The Register of Parks and Gardens entry for Regent's Park was amended in November 2008 to include Park Crescent and Park Square).

The garden is opened each year as part of the London Open Garden Squares Weekend, an initiative of the London Parks & Gardens Trust.

The east and west lodges of the garden facing the Marylebone Road are listed Grade II. The railings around the garden are also listed Grade II, as is the cattle trough opposite No. 14 Park Crescent.

Statue
Just inside the garden railings, facing the top of Portland Place, is a bronze statue of Queen Victoria's father, Prince Edward, Duke of Kent and Strathearn. Sculpted by Sebastian Gahagan and installed in January 1824, the statue is seven feet two inches tall and represents the Duke in his Field Marshal's uniform, over which he wears his ducal dress and the regalia of the Order of the Garter.

Related structures

Mews
There are mews behind the crescent; Park Crescent Mews East and West.

Subterranean structures
 A large ice house predates the crescent.
 An unusual and original local feature is the "Nursemaids' Tunnel", an early example of an underpass, linking the gardens of Park Crescent to the gardens of Park Square on the other side of Marylebone Road.
 Regent's Park tube station has two ramps/stairs but a sole entrance, on the Marylebone Road side of the garden.

References

External links

https://www.ianvisits.co.uk/articles/unbuilt-london-the-regents-circus-19275/

Communal gardens
Crescents (architecture)
Crown Estate
Garden squares in London
Georgian architecture in the City of Westminster
Grade I listed buildings in the City of Westminster
Grade I listed houses in London
Grade I listed parks and gardens in London
Houses completed in 1821
John Nash buildings
Regent's Park
Streets in the City of Westminster
Regency architecture in Westminster